(full title  (The Duke of Guise, or The Council of Blois)) is an opéra comique in three acts by George Onslow, to a libretto by François-Antoine-Eugène de Planard and Jules-Henri Vernoy de Saint-Georges, based on a play from 1809 of the same name by François Just Marie Raynouard. The opera received its premiere on 8 September 1837 at the Opéra-Comique in Paris.

The opera, which centres on the assassination of the Duc de Guise in 1588, was the third and last of Onslow's operas to be produced. The text and music were well received by the audience, but Gérard de Nerval complained in a review that they had not offered Jenny Colon the opportunity to display her talents.

Onslow made an arrangement of extracts of the opera for string quartet (his Op. 60).

Roles

References
Notes

Sources
 De Planard and Saint-Georges (1838). Guise, ou Les états de Blois: drame lyrique en trois actes , Brussels: J-A Lelong. Accessed on Google Books 6 October 2014.
 Tamvaco, Jean-Louis (ed.) (2000). Les cancans de l'opėra. 2 vols. Paris: CNRS Editions. 

Operas
1837 operas
French-language operas
Operas set in France
Operas based on plays
Opéras comiques
Opera world premieres at the Opéra-Comique
Operas set in the 16th century
Compositions by George Onslow
Cultural depictions of Henry I, Duke of Guise
Cultural depictions of Catherine de' Medici
Cultural depictions of Henry III of France